Mount Otis is a small rocky summit along the north side of Kirkpatrick Glacier in Antarctica. Mapped by United States Geological Survey (USGS) from surveys and U.S. Navy air photos, 1959–65. Named by Advisory Committee on Antarctic Names (US-ACAN) for Jack Otis, member of the biological party that made population studies of seals, whales, and birds in the pack ice of the Bellingshausen and Amundsen Seas using American Coast Guard cutter  USCGC Southwind and its two helicopters, 1971–72.

Mountains of Marie Byrd Land